Georg Mayer (born 12 October 1973) is an Austrian politician and Member of the European Parliament (MEP) from Austria. He is a member of the Freedom Party of Austria, part of the Europe of Nations and Freedom.

References

External links
 

1973 births
Living people
Freedom Party of Austria MEPs
MEPs for Austria 2014–2019
MEPs for Austria 2019–2024